Jonas Bruun Knudsen (born 16 September 1992) is a Danish professional footballer who plays as a defender for Malmö FF and the Denmark national team.

He played for Esbjerg fB from 2009 before signing with Ipswich Town in 2015. He is known for his long throws and in Denmark his throws have been compared to Rory Delap's.

Club career

Esbjerg fB
In November 2009 he signed his first professional contract with Esbjerg, and following the winter break of the Danish Superliga, he made his professional debut in a 0–4 home loss against Randers FC, becoming the second youngest Esbjerg debutant ever second only to Andreas Sørensen who made his debut aged 16 years.

Following the departure of Kevin Conboy to NEC, Knudsen established himself as the first choice left back for the club. In the 2012–13 season, the Esbjerg team finished fourth in the Danish Superliga and won the Danish Cup, and Knudsen was given a new contract in April 2013.

Ipswich Town
Knudsen signed for Ipswich Town on 31 July 2015 on a three-year deal. He debuted for the club on 8 August 2015, in a 2–2 draw with Brentford. He scored his first goal on 19 April 2016, scoring a late equaliser in a 1–1 draw with Fulham at Portman Road. He went on to make 43 appearances during his first season at Portman Road, scoring once.

He continued to feature as a first-team regular during his second season at the club, making his first appearance on the opening day of the season in a 4–2 win over Barnsley. During the season he memorably scored in both East Anglian derbies, which both finished 1–1. He made 36 appearances over the course of the season, scoring twice.

His first appearance of the 2017–18 season came on the opening day of the season in a 1–0 win over Birmingham City. On 21 December 2017, Ipswich took up the option to extend Knudsen's contract until 2019. He scored his first goal of the season on 10 April, netting the winner in a 1–0 home win over Barnsley. Knudsen took on the captain's armband for the final few games of the season, following injuries to club captain Luke Chambers. He made 44 appearances during the season, scoring once.

After returning from the 2018 FIFA World Cup, Knudsen was linked with moves from multiple clubs including Stoke City and Middlesbrough. He kept his place in the team once again, featuring as a first-team regular throughout the season. In January 2019 he informed the club that he would not be signing a new contract, and he was released at the end of the 2018–19 season following the expiration of his contract. Despite rejecting a new contract, Knudsen posted a farewell message on social media, thanking the fans for their support during his tenure.

Malmö FF
On 20 June 2019, Knudsen signed for Swedish club Malmö FF on a free transfer. He made his debut on 21 July 2019 in a 1–1 draw with IK Sirius.

International career
Knudsen has represented Denmark at various youth levels. He made his senior international debut as a substitute in a 1–0 friendly win over Sweden on 28 June 2014.

In May 2018 he was named in Denmark's preliminary 35-man squad for the 2018 FIFA World Cup in Russia. On 17 June, the Danish squad allowed Knudsen to fly home to meet his newborn daughter, as the Danish squad clubbed together to pay for a private flight as a paternity present for their team-mate. Following his return to Russia, he made his first and only appearance of Denmark's World Cup campaign on 1 July, starting and playing the full 120 minutes as Denmark drew 1–1 with Croatia, before exiting the tournament on penalties after extra time, with Knudsen playing his part in creating Denmark's opening goal following a long throw into the Croatian box.

He was included in Denmark's squad for the 2018–19 UEFA Nations League, featuring in the Dane's 0–0 draw with the Republic of Ireland in the group stages on 13 November 2018 at the Aarhus Idrætspark, Aarhus.

Career statistics

Club

International

Honours
Esbjerg fB
Danish Cup: 2012–13
Danish 1st Division: 2011–12

Malmö FF
Allsvenskan: 2020, 2021
Svenska Cupen: 2021–22

Individual
Esbjerg fB Player of the Year: 2014–15

References

External links
Danish national team profile
 Jonas Knudsen at Soccerbase

1992 births
Living people
People from Esbjerg
Danish men's footballers
Denmark youth international footballers
Denmark under-21 international footballers
Denmark international footballers
Association football defenders
Esbjerg fB players
Ipswich Town F.C. players
Malmö FF players
Danish Superliga players
Danish 1st Division players
English Football League players
Allsvenskan players
2018 FIFA World Cup players
Danish expatriate men's footballers
Expatriate footballers in England
Expatriate footballers in Sweden
Danish expatriate sportspeople in England
Danish expatriate sportspeople in Sweden
Sportspeople from the Region of Southern Denmark